Matanzas is one of the provinces of Cuba.  Major towns in the province include Cárdenas, Colón, Jovellanos and the capital of the same name, Matanzas. The resort town of Varadero is also located in this province.

Among Cuban provinces, Matanzas is one of the most industrialized, with petroleum wells, refineries, supertanker facilities, and 21 sugar mills to process the harvests of the fields of sugarcane in the province.

Geography
The second largest in Cuba, Matanzas province is largely flat, with its highest point (Pan de Matanzas) at only 380m above sea level.

The north-western coast is largely rocky, with a few beaches, while the north-eastern coast has numerous small cays of its coast (part of Sabana-Camaguey Archipelago), and scrubland and mangroves near the shoreline. Cuba's northernmost point is located in on Hicacos Peninsula.

The southern coast has one of Cuba's most distinctive features: an enormous marsh, Ciénaga de Zapata that covers both the southern part of the province and the Zapata Peninsula. East of the peninsula lies the Bay of Pigs, the site of the failed US backed invasion.

Municipalities 
From 1976 to 2010 Matanzas was sub-divided into 14 municipalities.
Starting from 2011, the municipality of Varadero was abolished and merged to Cárdenas. Thus Matanzas now has 13 municipalities.

Source: Population from 2004 Census. Area from 1976 municipal re-distribution.

Demographics
In 2004, the province of Matanzas  had a population of 675,980.

See also

References

Further reading

External links

Provincial portal

 
Provinces of Cuba